The 1980 Swedish Open was a men's professional tennis tournament played on outdoor clay courts and held in Båstad, Sweden. It was part of the 1980 Grand Prix circuit. It was the 33rd edition of the tournament and was held from 14 July through 20 July 1980. First-seeded Balázs Taróczy won the singles title.

Finals

Singles
 Balázs Taróczy defeated  Tony Giammalva 6–3, 3–6, 7–6
 It was Taróczy's 1st singles title of the year and the 7th of his career.

Doubles
 Heinz Gunthardt /  Markus Günthardt  defeated  John Feaver /  Peter McNamara 6–4, 6–4

References

External links
 ITF tournament edition details

Swedish Open
Swedish Open
Swedish Open
Swedish Open